Fulmort is a townland in County Westmeath, Ireland.

Fulmort is one of 10 townlands of the civil parish of Lackan in the barony of Corkaree in the Province of Leinster.

The neighbouring townlands are: Lackan to the north, Rathganny to the east and Heathland, Kilpatrick, Knockmorris and Leny to the south.

In the 1911 census of Ireland there were 12 houses and 43 inhabitants in the townland.

References

External links
Fulmort at the IreAtlas Townland Data Base
Fulmort at Townlands.ie
 Fulmort at Logainm.ie

Townlands of County Westmeath